IPv6-to-IPv6 Network Prefix Translation (NPTv6) is a specification for IPv6 to achieve address-independence at the network edge, similar to network address translation (NAT) in Internet Protocol version 4 (IPv4). It has fewer architectural problems than traditional IPv4 NAT; for example, it is stateless and preserves the reachability attributed to the end-to-end principle. However, the method may not translate embedded IPv6 addresses properly (IPsec can be impacted), and split-horizon DNS may be required for use in a business environment.

NPTv6 differs from NAT66, which is stateful. 
With NPTv6, no port translation is required nor other manipulation of transport characteristics. 
Compared to NAT66, with NPTv6 there is end-to-end reachability along with 1:1 address mapping. 
This makes NPTv6 a better choice than NAT66.

References

External links
 Cisco documentation on NPTv6
 Juniper documentation on NPTv6
 VyOS documentation on NPTv6
 OPNsense documentation on NPTv6
 APNIC blog post from 2018 on NAT66
 pfSense documentation on NPt

IPv6
Network address translation